Postplatyptilia pluvia is a moth of the family Pterophoridae. It is known from Ecuador.

The wingspan is 18–21 mm. Adults are on wing in October.

Etymology
The name reflects the rainy conditions under which the species was collected. On those nights which were dry and moonlit the temperature dropped to freezing, and no collecting could be done.

References

pluvia
Moths described in 2006